Gimli was a provincial electoral division in the Canadian province of Manitoba.  It was created by redistribution in 1899, and existed continuously until the 2019 election. Following this, it was redistributed into the Interlake-Gimli electoral district.

Gimli was located to the immediate north of the City of Winnipeg.  It was bordered to the north by Interlake, to the west by Interlake and Lakeside, and to the east by Lake Winnipeg and Selkirk.

Communities in the riding included Gimli, Winnipeg Beach, Petersfield, Clandeboye and Matlock.

The riding's population in 1996 was 19,700.  In 1999, the average family income was $58,790, and the unemployment rate was 7.90%.  The service sector accounts for 15% of industry in the riding, with a further 11% each in manufacturing and the retail trade.  There is also a significant fishing and tourism economy in the riding.

Gimli is home to the largest Icelandic community in the world outside Iceland, and many of its MLAs have been from this background.  It also has significant Ukrainian and German communities, at 12% and 6% respectively.

Gimli was a "bellwether" riding, and has elected a candidate from a governing party in all but five elections since its establishment (the exceptions were 1907, 1920, 1922, 1936 and 1999).

List of provincial representatives

Electoral results

1899 general election

1903 general election

1907 general election

1910 general election

1913 by-election

1914 general election

1915 general election

1920 general election

1922 general election

1927 general election

1932 general election

1936 general election

1941 general election

1945 general election

1949 general election

1953 general election

1958 general election

1959 general election

1962 general election

1966 general election

1969 general election

1973 general election

1977 general election

1981 general election

1986 general election

1988 general election

1990 general election

1995 general election

1999 general election

2003 general election

2007 general election

2011 general election

2016 general election

Previous boundaries

References

Former provincial electoral districts of Manitoba